Naranol (W-5494A) is a drug with a tetracyclic structure. It was synthesized in the late 1960s, and was reported to have antidepressant, anxiolytic, and antipsychotic properties, but was never marketed.

See also 
 Tricyclic

References 

Tetracyclic antidepressants
Lactols
Piperidines
Abandoned drugs
Naphthol ethers